Puthur means new village/town/settlement in Malayalam. It may refer to :

 Places and jurisdictions in southern India 
 in Kerala state :
 Puthur (Palakkad), a town near Palakkad
 Puthur (Kasaragod), a census town near Kasaragod 
 Puthur, Thrissur, a village in Thrissur district 
 Puthoor (Kannur), a village in Kannur district 
 Puthoor, near Kollam in Kollam district
 the Syro-Malankara Catholic Eparchy of Puthur, an Eastern Catholic (Antiochian Rite) diocese in Karnataka state

 People
 Unnikrishnan Puthur, Malayalam language author

 Other usage
 Puthur-Vela, the annual festival at the Puthur Thirupuraikkal Bhagavathy temple, located in Puthur, Kerala, India

See also 
 Pudur (disambiguation) 
 Puttur (disambiguation)